

Group A

Kazakhstan
Kazakhstan's 17-man squad to play in the 2015 Kazakhstan President Cup.

Coach:  Carles Martorell Baques

Kyrgyzstan
Kyrgyzstan 16 man squad to play in the 2015 Kazakhstan President Cup.

Coach: Samat Suymaliev

Spain
Spain 16 man squad to play in the 2015 Kazakhstan President Cup.

Coach:  Santiago Denia

Tajikistan
Tajikistan 16 man squad to play in the 2015 Kazakhstan President Cup.

Coach:  Zayniddin Rahimov

Group B

Azerbaijan
Azerbaijan's 17-man squad to play in the 2015 Kazakhstan President Cup.

Coach:  Tabriz Hasanov

Belarus
Belarus's 17-man squad to play in the 2015 Kazakhstan President Cup.

Coach:  Vladzimir Pihuleuski

Georgia
Georgia's 17-man squad to play in the 2015 Kazakhstan President Cup.

Coach:  Gocha Avsajanishvili

Russia
Russia's 17-man squad to play in the 2015 Kazakhstan President Cup.

Coach:  Oleg Levin

Kazakhstan President Cup (football)